"Higher States" is a song by English band Sundara Karma. It was released as the third single from their second studio album, Ulfilas' Alphabet, on 24 January 2019.

Artwork 
The album cover features a snake in a spiral. The cover received criticism due to the similarities to Vampire Weekend's single cover for "Harmony Hall/2021" which also features a spiral snake. Coincidentally, both singles were released on 24 January 2019.

Composition 
Oscar Pollock described the track as their "rapid firearm", specifically saying that "all songs are equal, but some songs are more equal than others. This song is our equaliser, our rapid firearm. It’s invasive like a blazing probe and has more drops than Diplo."

Critical reception 
Sam Taylor, writing for Dork praised the track, calling "Higher States" "a 10/10 banger".

Will Oliver, writing for the music webzine, We All Want Someone To Shout For, said "Higher States" had the band's expected "eccentric vibe". He summarized the track as "a more pop-friendly Wild Beasts".

Music video 
On 13 February 2019, the band released the music video to "Higher States". Frontman, Oscar Pollock edited and directed the music video. In orchestrating the music video, Pollock described himself as a "mad scientist". Pollock said that "I wanted to edit the video as well as direct it and it was ALL CONSUMING! I’m really not the most skilled editor and because I wanted the video to have an extremely fast pace it took me like 1 hour to do 5 seconds of footage. I was a wreck by the end of it. I did it all on my laptop and if you saw me during that period I Iooked like a mad scientist or something… grizzly stuff but I'm super happy with how it turned out!"

Clash magazine said of the music video "has a cinematic quality" and that "the results are brash, eye-catching, and certainly thought-provoking."

Credits and personnel 
The following individuals were credited with the recording, composition, and mastering of the track.

Sundara Karma
 Ally Baty — Guitar
 Dom Cordell — Bass
 Haydn Evans — Drums
 Matt Maltese — Piano
 Oscar Pollock — Guitar, vocals

Recording and Mastering

 Duncan Fuller —	Engineer
 Kaines — Producer, Programming
 Stuart Price — Producer
 Oscar Pollock — Artwork, Composer, Design, Group Member, Guitar, Vocals
 Stuart Price — Mixing, Producer, Programming
 Sundara Karma — Primary Artist
 Josie Wright — Artwork, Design
 Tim Young — Mastering

References

External links 
 
 
 

2019 singles
2019 songs
Sundara Karma songs
RCA Records singles
Song recordings produced by Stuart Price